Hendrik Elle "Henk" Koning (7 June 1933 – 31 December 2016) was a Dutch politician of the People's Party for Freedom and Democracy (VVD) and economist.

Koning attended the Praedinius Gymnasium in Groningen from April 1946 until May 1952 and applied at the National Tax Academy in Rotterdam in June 1952 and simultaneously applied at the Leiden University in July 1952 majoring in Tax law and obtaining a Bachelor of Laws degree in June 1954 before graduating with a Master of Laws degree in July 1958. Koning worked as a civil servant for Tax and Customs Administration of the Ministry of Finance from August 1958 until February 1967. Koning served on the Provincial-Council of South Holland from 2 June 1966 until 4 January 1968.

Koning was elected as a Member of the House of Representatives after the election of 1967, taking office on 23 February 1967 serving as a frontbencher and spokesperson for Law enforcement and Transport. Koning also served on the Municipal Council of Rotterdam from March 1971 until May 1974, from April 1976 until December 1977 and from March 1980 until November 1982. After the election of 1977 Koning was appointed as State Secretary for the Interior in the Cabinet Van Agt-Wiegel, taking office on 28 December 1977. After the election of 1981 Koning returned as a Member of the House of Representatives, taking office on 25 August 1981 serving as a frontbencher and the de facto Whip. The Cabinet Van Agt-Wiegel was replaced by the Cabinet Van Agt II after the cabinet formation of 1981 on 11 September 1981. After the election of 1982 Koning was appointed as State Secretary for Finance in the Cabinet Lubbers I, taking office on 5 November 1982. After the election of 1986 Koning again returned as a Member of the House of Representatives, taking office on 3 June 1986. Following the cabinet formation of 1986 Koning continued as State Secretary for Finance in the Cabinet Lubbers II, taking office on 14 July 1986. The Cabinet Lubbers II fell on 3 May 1989 following a disagreement in the coalition about the increase of tariffs and excises and continued to serve in a demissionary capacity. After the election of 1989 Koning once again returned as a Member of the House of Representatives, taking office on 14 September 1989 serving as a frontbencher chairing the parliamentary committee for Finances and spokesperson for Finances and deputy spokesperson for Economic Affairs. The Cabinet Lubbers III was replaced by the Cabinet Lubbers III after the cabinet formation of 1989 on 7 November 1989.

In October 1991 Koning was nominated as President of the Court of Audit, he resigned as Member of the House of Representatives the same day he was installed as president, serving from 1 November 1991 until 1 April 1999.

Koning retired after spending 32 years in national politics and became active in the private sector and public sector and occupied numerous seats as a corporate director and nonprofit director on several boards of directors and supervisory boards (ING Group, DSM company, Randstad Holding, Den Haan Rotterdam B.V., Prince Bernhard Culture Foundation, Maritime Museum Rotterdam and the Energy Research Centre) and served on several state commissions and councils on behalf of the government (Public Pension Funds PFZW, Cadastre Agency and Statistics Netherlands).

Decorations

References

External links

Official
  Mr. H.E. (Henk) Koning Parlement & Politiek

1933 births
2016 deaths
Commanders Crosses of the Order of Merit of the Federal Republic of Germany
Art collectors from The Hague
Dutch corporate directors
Dutch fiscal jurists
Dutch Freemasons
Dutch nonprofit directors
Dutch Roman Catholics
Grand Officers of the Order of Orange-Nassau
Grand Officers of the Order of Leopold II
Knights Commander of the Order of St Gregory the Great
Knights of the Holy Sepulchre
Knights of the Order of the Netherlands Lion
Leiden University alumni
Members of the Court of Audit (Netherlands)
Members of the House of Representatives (Netherlands)
Members of the Provincial Council of South Holland
Municipal councillors of Rotterdam
People from Midden-Drenthe
People's Party for Freedom and Democracy politicians
State Secretaries for Finance of the Netherlands
State Secretaries for the Interior of the Netherlands
Tax collectors
20th-century Dutch civil servants
20th-century Dutch economists
20th-century Dutch jurists
20th-century Dutch politicians